Proterra is an American automotive and energy storage company based in Burlingame, California. The company designs and manufactures battery electric transit buses, battery systems for other heavy-duty vehicle builders, and charging systems for fleets of heavy-duty vehicles. Founded in 2004, it became a public company in June 2021. The company delivered 208 new transit buses and battery systems for 273 vehicles in 2021.

History 
Proterra was founded in Golden, Colorado, by Dale Hill in 2004. Hill had previously founded TransTeq, a Denver, Colorado, bus manufacturing company, as well as Alumatech, a manufacturing company that made aluminum dump trailers. TransTeq was best known for building the fleet of "EcoMark" buses used on the 16th Street Mall in Denver that were series hybrids with batteries charged by a generator connected to a small compressed natural gas fueled engine.

Proterra would abandon the CNG technology used by its predecessor TransTeq, to take advantage of Federal Transit Administration (FTA)'s push for alternative fuels and forms of mobility through such programs as the Clean Fuels Grant Program Bus and Bus Facilities, and the TIGER and TIGGER programs, which excluded CNG buses.

A prototype of the company's first product, the EcoRide, was first shown at the 2008 APTA Expo. The battery-electric bus had a composite body and range-extending hydrogen fuel cell auxiliary power unit (APU). Ultimately, the company decided to abandon the APU by the time the bus went on a tour of several cities in California in 2009. The prototype helped secure an order from Southern California's Foothill Transit, which receive several EcoRide BE35 buses in 2010.

In February 2010, Proterra announced that it would move its manufacturing plant from Golden to a location in Greenville, South Carolina just outside of the Clemson University International Center for Automotive Research (CU-ICAR). In October 2011, the company announced it would consolidate all operations in Greenville, moving management and research teams from Colorado.

Ryan Popple, formerly of Tesla Motors, was appointed CEO in 2014. In 2015, Proterra was awarded a $3 million grant from the California Energy Commission to fund the design, development and construction of the company's battery-electric transit bus manufacturing line in the City of Industry, California. Proterra moved its headquarters from Greenville, South Carolina, to Burlingame, California, in October 2015. Popple served as CEO of Proterra until 2020 when board member Jack Allen was appointed CEO and Popple became the Executive Director. Popple continued to work at Proterra until his death in 2021 

In January 2021, the company became publicly listed on the Nasdaq after a reverse takeover of a special-purpose acquisition company, ArcLight Clean Transition Corporation. 

In December of 2021 Gareth Joyce was appointed CEO effective January 1, 2022, while Jack Allen retired from the CEO role but continued to serve on the board.

Products

EcoRide 

The first EcoRide BE35, which omitted the APU, toured several cities in California in 2009. EcoRide was offered only with a lithium-titanate battery chemistry, which enabled fast on-route charging using the company's proprietary charger, but limited range. Foothill Transit was the launch customer, accepting delivery of several EcoRide BE35 buses in 2010.

The EcoRide was replaced by the larger Catalyst in 2014.

Catalyst 

The Proterra Catalyst was an evolution of the EcoRide, initially available as a standard  transit bus length in 2014 with the same fast-charging battery as the EcoRide and a similar composite chassis. A  Catalyst was introduced in 2015 to directly replace the earlier EcoRide. Also in 2015, Proterra introduced the extended range (XR) battery, which offered greater range with slow charging at a storage yard. In 2016, Proterra introduced the Energy Efficient (E2) battery which offered even greater range. In 2017, a second drivetrain option featuring two traction motors for greater efficiency (branded DuoPower) was introduced. In 2018, Proterra discontinued its proprietary overhead "blade" charger in favor of the then standardized SAE J3105 charging options.

The Catalyst was replaced by the ZX5 line in 2020.

ZX5 

The Proterra ZX5 was announced as the replacement to the Catalyst, available in  nominal lengths. Edmonton Transit System of Edmonton, Alberta was the launch customer for the 40-foot ZX5.

The ZX5 features the same composite chassis as the Catalyst, but incorporates several design changes. Visually, the vehicle appears more angular, while the roof fairing is more streamlined and  shorter. On the roof, provisions were added for additional battery packs and SAE J3105 (OppCharge) fast-charging rails.

The ZX5 is offered with multiple battery options, designated ZX5, ZX5+, and ZX5 MAX for the 220, 440, and  models, respectively. Each of the three battery options is also offered with one of two drivetrains, which Proterra brands DuoPower (two traction motors) or ProDrive (single traction motor).

Battery systems for others 
Van Hool announced a partnership with Proterra in October 2017 to build an electric version of the CX45 motorcoach. The CX45E would be followed by a shorter CX35E model. Both of the Van Hool coaches were powered by the Proterra E2 battery.

Alexander Dennis has been offering an electric version of its Enviro500 double-decker bus with powertrains built by Proterra. The Enviro500EV will use Proterra E2 battery packs, on-board charging hardware, and thermal management.

Thomas Built Buses announced a partnership with Proterra in October 2018 to build an electric version of the Saf-T-Liner C2 school bus, called the "Jouley."

ENC announced a partnership with Proterra in September 2022 to build an electric version of the Axess transit bus, a direct competitor to the ZX5.

The partnerships with other bus OEMs led Proterra to announce in August 2019 the Proterra Powered initiative, which supports OEMs that are interested in using Proterra's battery-electric drivetrain for heavy-duty commercial vehicles.

Development and manufacturing 
Proterra has its headquarters and a battery manufacturing facility in Burlingame, California, located in Silicon Valley. Batteries are also manufactured and transit buses are assembled in Southern California's City of Industry. The company also has a second transit bus assembly facility in Greenville, South Carolina, that sits directly outside the Clemson University International Center for Automotive Research (CU-ICAR).

The company's composite bus bodies are supplied by TPI Composites using its factory in Warren, Rhode Island. TPI had previously developed a composite bus body for North American Bus Industries which was marketed as the Compobus. Proterra says that compared to a traditional steel body and frame, the composite body is lighter and allows most of the battery packs to be placed below the floor of the vehicle, between the axles, to achieve a low center of gravity.

Proterra offers a battery leasing program where customers pay for the price of the battery over time, rather than upfront when the bus is purchased. The company says that many customers can make lease payments using their operational savings from reduced fuel and maintenance costs.

Chassis defects in Philadelphia 
An entire fleet of 25 first-generation Proterra buses, reportedly the third largest electric bus fleet in the United States, were pulled from service in Philadelphia in February 2020. SEPTA transit agency discovered defects in the buses' third-party produced TPI Composites chassis. This is the third systemic fleet maintenance issue uncovered by a PlanPhilly inquiry in less than a year.

In a March 2021 email, SEPTA General Manager Leslie Richards said she planned to tell Federal Transit Administration officials, who helped underwrite the initial purchase of Proterra buses with a $2.6 million federal grant, that she had doubts about “the future of electric vehicle procurement.”

“I plan on explaining why we do not feel the current technology is a good investment at this time,” she wrote.
“Proterra and its structural consultant … have been uncooperative in the resolution process,” wrote chief vehicle engineering officer Dave Warner last summer.

Proterra frames were made out of a composite material. Unlike all-metal frames, they used a mix of resin, fiberglass, carbon fiber, balsa wood, and steel reinforcement plates, according to a SEPTA report on the cracks. Company lawyers would later analogize the issue to cracking paint applied to a metal frame, raising doubts the issue could ever be “fixed.”

“Proterra is unable to repair or permanently prevent the recurrence of cracking because it is an inherent part of the composite body material,” wrote Josh Ensign, Proterra’s chief operating officer.

The issue has not been reported amongst further US transit agencies, with Delaware's DART transit agency stating that their models, also Proterra manufactured, were not experiencing the same issues.

See also 
Competing transit bus manufacturers:
 BYD Auto
 New Flyer
 Nova Bus

References

External links 

American companies established in 2004
Electric bus manufacturers
Bus manufacturers of the United States
Companies based in Burlingame, California
Motor vehicle manufacturers based in California
Vehicle manufacturing companies established in 2004
2004 establishments in Colorado
Electric vehicle manufacturers of the United States
Companies listed on the Nasdaq
2021 initial public offerings